Ɇ (lowercase: ɇ) is a letter of the Latin alphabet, derived from E with the addition of a diagonal stroke through the letter. It is present in the orthography of the Mazahua language, where it is used to represent [].

Code positions

Latin letters with diacritics